The Stenaliini are a tribe of beetles in the family Mordellidae.

Genera
Brodskyella Horák, 1989
Pselaphostena Franciscolo, 1950
Stenalia Mulsant, 1856
Stenaliodes Franciscolo, 1956

References

Mordellidae